Ricky 'Rick' Duane Moye (born December 4, 1956 in Beckley, West Virginia) is an American politician and a Democratic member of the West Virginia House of Delegates representing District 29 since January 12, 2013. Moye served consecutively from January 2007 until January 2013 in the District 27 seat.

Education
Moye attended Beckley College (later Mountain State University, since closed).

Elections
2012 Redistricted to District 29, Moye and returning 2006 Republican opponent Ron Hedrick both won their May 8, 2012 primaries, setting up a rematch; Moye won the November 6, 2012 General election with 4,049 votes (58.0%) against Hedrick, who had also run for the District 27 seat in 2004.
2006 When District 27 incumbent Democratic Representatives Robert S. Kiss retired and Sally Susman ran for West Virginia Senate leaving two district seats open, Moye placed in the ten-way five-selectee 2006 Democratic Primary and was elected in the ten-way five-position November 7, 2006 General election along with incumbent Representatives Virginia Mahan (D), Linda Sumner (R), and Ron Thompson (D), and Democratic nominee Mel Kessler, who had run for the seat in 2002.
2008 When Representative Kessler ran for West Virginia Governor and left a seat open, Moye placed third in the ten-way May 13, 2008 Democratic Primary with 7,941 votes (12.8%), and placed second in the ten-way five-position November 4, 2008 General election with 15,918 votes (12.3%) behind incumbent Representative Sumner (R) and ahead of former state Senator Bill Wooten (D) and Representatives Susman (D) and Mahan (D), and non-selectees Louis Gall (D), Jeffrey Pack (R), Dereck Severt (R), Philip Stevens (R) and Albert Honaker (R).
2010 Moye placed first in the six-way May 11, 2010 Democratic Primary with 4,346 votes (19.5%), and placed third in the nine-way five-position November 2, 2010 General election with 11,644 votes (15.1%) behind Representatives Sumner (R) and Republican nominee Rick Snuffer and ahead of Republican nominee John O'Neal and Representative Wooten (D), and non-selectees former Representative Susman (D), unseating Representatives Kessler (D) and Mahan (D), and Republican nominee Richard Franklin.

References

External links
Official page at the West Virginia Legislature

Rick Moye at Ballotpedia
Rick Moye at the National Institute on Money in State Politics

1956 births
Living people
Democratic Party members of the West Virginia House of Delegates
Politicians from Beckley, West Virginia
21st-century American politicians